John Paulet, 2nd Marquess of Winchester ( – 4 November 1576), styled The Honourable John Paulet between 1539 and 1550, Lord St John between 1550 and 1551 and Earl of Wiltshire between 1551 and 1555, was an English peer. He was the eldest son of William Paulet, 1st Marquess of Winchester and Elizabeth Capel.

Career 
John Paulet was knighted by Henry VIII at Boulogne on 30 September 1544. After the death of Edward VI he was (with his father) one of the signatories to the settlement of the Crown on Lady Jane Grey of 16 June 1553, although he later changed his allegiance to Queen Mary. He was styled Lord St John from 1550 to 1572. He was summoned to Parliament on 3 October 1554 in one of his father's baronies as Lord St John. He was one of the Peers at the trial of the Duke of Norfolk on 16 January 1572. He succeeded his father as Marquess of Winchester on 10 March 1572.

The offices he held during his career included:
 High Sheriff of Hampshire 1533–34
 High Sheriff of Somerset and Dorset 1543–44
 Steward of Canford castle 1549/50
 Constable of Corfe Castle 1549/50
 Lord Lieutenant of Dorset 1557
 Governor of the Isle of Wight 1558
 Keeper of St Andrew's Castle, Hamble 1572–1576

Marriages and issue 
Paulet was married three times:
 He married as his first wife, by 20 October 1528, Elizabeth, daughter of Robert Willoughby, 2nd Baron Willoughby de Broke by his second wife, Dorothy, daughter of Thomas Grey, 1st Marquess of Dorset, and by her had four sons and two daughters:
 William Paulet, 3rd Marquess of Winchester ( – 24 November 1598)
 George Paulet
 Richard Paulet
 Thomas Paulet
 Elizabeth Paulet, married firstly Sir William Courtenay of Powderham and secondly Sir Henry Ughtred
 Mary Paulet (died 10 October 1592), married Henry Cromwell, 2nd Baron Cromwell
 He married secondly, between 10 March and 24 April 1554, Elizabeth Seymour, daughter of Sir John Seymour and Margery Wentworth, and widow of Gregory Cromwell, 1st Baron Cromwell.
 He married thirdly, before 30 September 1568, Winifred, widow of Sir Richard Sackville, and daughter of John Brydges, a former Lord Mayor of London. He succeeded his father as Marquess of Winchester in 1572.

Death 
John Paulet died at Chelsea on 4 November 1576 and was buried in St. Mary's Church, Basing, Hampshire. His widow, Winifred, died at Chelsea in 1586 and was buried in Westminster Abbey.

References

Bibliography

External links 
 

1510s births
1576 deaths
16th-century English nobility
John
People from Basingstoke and Deane
2
Burials at St. Mary's Church, Old Basing